The Stratford and Moreton Tramway was a 16-mile (25-km) long horse-drawn wagonway which ran from the canal basin at Stratford-upon-Avon in Warwickshire to Moreton-in-Marsh in Gloucestershire, with a branch to Shipston-on-Stour. The main line opened in 1826, whilst the branch to Shipston opened in 1836

The tramway was used to carry Black Country coal to the rural districts of southern Warwickshire via the Stratford-on-Avon Canal, and limestone and agricultural produce northwards. 

The northern part of the tramway had fallen into disuse by the early 1900s and was dismantled in 1918. The southern section between Moreton-in-Marsh and Shipston-on-Stour was converted into a steam railway in 1889, and continued in use as a minor branch line until 1960.

Background
The parliamentary act for the line was passed in 1821 and construction was completed in 1826, the route having been surveyed by the railway promoter William James and engineered by John Urpeth Rastrick.

The tramway was built as part of an early and ambitious scheme known as the Central Junction Railway promoted by William James, to link the Midlands with London via canal between Birmingham and Stratford-upon-Avon, tramway to Oxford, and finally by river barge down the River Thames to London. However, only part of this route, to Moreton-in-Marsh, and one of the three planned branches was ever built. It was built with the  Stephenson gauge, adopted by George Stephenson in the north-east of England.

The branch to Shipston-on-Stour, was authorised on 10 June 1833, and opened on 11 February 1836.

Operational history
 
Goods traffic was conveyed by licensed carriers in their own wagons. They could also purchase a further licence costing £12 per annum, to carry passengers.

By 1829, the tramway was making an operating profit, although the profits were not sufficient to pay off the considerable debts which the tramway had accrued.

The steam hauled Oxford, Worcester and Wolverhampton Railway (OW&WR) opened in 1853 serving Moreton-in-Marsh with a new railway station, which severed the terminal buildings from the branch. This had compelled the OW&WR to take over the tramway on a perpetual lease from 1 May 1847. The OW&WR itself became part of the Great Western Railway (GWR) in 1863. Although the tramway continued to carry some traffic, by 1904, the northern section of the tramway to Stratford had become disused, and the tracks were lifted in 1918 as a wartime economy measure. The line was formally abandoned by an Act of Parliament in 1926, exactly 100 years after it had been opened.

The southern portion of the tramway between Moreton and Shipston-on-Stour however lasted longer: The GWR upgraded the line to allow it to be converted it into a conventional steam railway; to do this they had to obtain an Act of Parliament to allow the use of steam locomotives. The line reopened in its new form on 1 July 1889 with locomotive operation, It therefore became the Shipston-on-Stour branch of the Great Western Railway. The sharp curves of the tramway alignment made it a slow journey. A passenger service of four trains each way per-day operated until 8 July 1929. Goods operation continued until closure on 2 May 1960.

Remains

The most prominent remaining piece of infrastructure, is the tramway's brick arch bridge across the River Avon at Stratford, which remains in use as a public footbridge, and is still known as the Tramway Bridge.

One of the horse-drawn wagons, which belonged to Thomas Hutchings of Newbold Lime Works, is preserved a short distance north of the Tramway Bridge, near the Shakespeare Memorial Theatre in Stratford-on-Avon, which sits on a short stretch of preserved tramway track on stone blocks. Newbold Lime Works would have been at Newbold on Stour.

Another old coal wagon from the tramway is preserved at the National Railway Museum at York. This dates from c 1840, and was formerly used by Thomas James, Coal Merchant, Shipston-on-Stour.

Uses since closure
In 2020, as a result of more people walking and cycling during the COVID-19 pandemic, a Community Interest Company called Old Tramway Revived was set up with the aim to reopen more of the old tramway route south from Stratford-upon-Avon alongside the A3400 as an active transportation corridor towards Shipston. The company has already received support from several of the local councils, and in a presentation to the Stratford Society it was noted that there was a previous abandoned attempt to reopen the route in the mid 1980s that used Manpower Services Commission labour to clear some of the line.

References
Notes

Sources

External links

Early British railway companies
Rail transport in Warwickshire
History of Warwickshire
Rail transport in Gloucestershire
History of Gloucestershire
Railway companies established in 1821
Railway lines opened in 1826
Railway companies disestablished in 1868
Horse-drawn railways
1826 establishments in England
British companies established in 1821